Horst Nußbaumer (born 13 June 1971) is an Austrian rower. He competed at the 1992 Summer Olympics, 1996 Summer Olympics and the 2000 Summer Olympics.

References

1971 births
Living people
Austrian male rowers
Olympic rowers of Austria
Rowers at the 1992 Summer Olympics
Rowers at the 1996 Summer Olympics
Rowers at the 2000 Summer Olympics
People from Kirchdorf an der Krems
Sportspeople from Upper Austria